7th Regiment, or 7th Infantry Regiment may refer to:

Active units
7th Parachute Regiment Royal Horse Artillery
7th Field Regiment, Royal Australian Artillery
7th Field Artillery Regiment (United States)
7th Cavalry Regiment (United States)
7th Marine Regiment (United States)
7th Toronto Regiment, RCA - Canadian army
7th Infantry Regiment (South Korea)
7th Infantry Regiment (United States)
7th Army Aviation Regiment (Ukraine)
7th Infantry Regiment (Argentina)
7th Infantry Regiment (Lithuania)

Former Units
7th Queen's Own Hussars - British army cavalry
7th Royal Tank Regiment - World War II British army unit
7th Medium Regiment, Royal Canadian Artillery - World War II Canadian army unit
2/7th Armoured Regiment (Australia) - World War II unit
7th Hariana Lancers - British Indian army unit
7th Light Cavalry - British Indian army unit
7th Regiment of Foot, later known as the Royal Fusiliers
7th Air Reconnaissance Regiment, Yugoslav Air Force unit

American Civil War units

Cavalry
7th Regiment Illinois Volunteer Cavalry
7th Regiment Iowa Volunteer Cavalry
7th Michigan Volunteer Cavalry Regiment
7th West Virginia Volunteer Cavalry Regiment

Infantry
7th California Infantry Regiment (1861), also known as the 7th California Volunteer Infantry
7th Illinois Volunteer Infantry Regiment
7th Regiment Indiana Infantry (3 months)
7th Regiment Indiana Infantry (3 years)
7th Iowa Volunteer Infantry Regiment
7th Regiment Maryland Volunteer Infantry
7th Regiment Massachusetts Volunteer Infantry
7th Michigan Volunteer Infantry Regiment
7th Minnesota Volunteer Infantry Regiment
7th New Hampshire Volunteer Regiment
7th New York Militia Regiment
7th New York Volunteer Infantry Regiment
7th Ohio Infantry Regiment
7th United States Colored Infantry
7th Vermont Infantry
7th West Virginia Volunteer Infantry Regiment
7th Wisconsin Volunteer Infantry Regiment

American Revolutionary War units
7th Massachusetts Regiment
7th Virginia Regiment
7th Connecticut Regiment
7th Maryland Regiment
7th Continental Regiment
7th Pennsylvania Regiment
7th North Carolina Regiment

United States State militia and National Guard units 1865-1917 
 7th California Infantry Regiment (National Guard)
 7th Illinois Infantry Regiment (National Guard)
 7th Ohio Infantry Regiment (National Guard)
  7th New York Militia Regiment (National Guard)

Spanish–American War units 
 7th California Volunteer Infantry Regiment (1898)
 7th Illinois Volunteer Infantry Regiment (1898)
 7th Ohio Volunteer Infantry Regiment (1898)

See also
Regiment, a military unit
7th Army (disambiguation)
7th Brigade (disambiguation)
7th Corps (disambiguation)
7th Division (disambiguation)
7th Signal Regiment (disambiguation)